Gerard L. Bush (September 6, 1914 – October 27, 1976) was a college men's basketball coach and player. He was the head coach of Toledo from 1947 to 1954 and Nebraska from 1954 to 1963. He coached his teams to a 208–190 record, winning a Mid-American Conference championship and one NCAA tournament appearance.  He played his college basketball at St. John's.  He was inducted into the Toledo athletics Hall of Fame in 1986.

He was the grandfather of current Nebraska Cornhuskers men's basketball head coach Fred Hoiberg, and also the cousin of National Basketball League player Jake Ahearn.

Head coaching record

References

1914 births
1976 deaths
Akron Firestone Non-Skids players
American men's basketball coaches
American men's basketball players
Basketball coaches from New York (state)
Basketball players from New York City
Detroit Eagles players
Nebraska Cornhuskers men's basketball coaches
Sportspeople from Brooklyn
St. John's Red Storm men's basketball players
Toledo Rockets men's basketball coaches
Forwards (basketball)